Sakesar  (Punjabi), is the highest mountain in the Salt Range in Punjab Pakistan. Its height is 1,522m. It lies on the outer fringes of the Soon Valley in Khushab District in the Punjab Province. Uchhali Lake is just below it. It is a good picnic spot and moderately tough walking point.

History
The mountain used to be the summer headquarters for the deputy commissioners of three districts - Campbellpur (now Attock), Mianwali and Sargodha.

In view of Sakesar's ideal location and height, the PAF selected it in the late 1950s as the site for a high-powered radar which would provide air defence cover for the northeastern part of the western wing.  The hilltop of Sakesar is located in the Salt Range -  starting from Sohawa (in Jhelum District) in the east and spreading westward.

Important lakes
 Khabikki Lake - 37 km
 Uchhali Lake - 13 km respectively - Boating available
 Nammal Lake - 40 km North-Northwest of Sakesar
 Jahlar Lake - 148 acres - Birds from Siberia travel here from distant places

Wildlife
WWF Survey carried out in September 2001 indicated that over 60 species of birds (some of them rare ones) and 10 species of mammals exist in and around Sakesar. Jackal, wild boar and moles can be seen frequently. Pangolins are said to have been found in Sakesar.

Villages
The main villages in the valley are:
Amb Shareef (location of mountain temple), Dhadhar (Oldest Village of Valley) Anga (2nd Oldest Village of Valley),Jahlar,  Chitta, Dhaka, Jaba, Khura, Khabeki, Uchalla, Khotakka, Koradhi, Kufri (currently known as Sadiq Abad), Mardwal, Sabhral, Shakarkot, Sirhaal, Sodhi, Surrakki, Ugali, Noshehra and Uchhali. These all names were given to the areas by the peoples (who migrated to India) here before the separation of Pakistan and India. Some old shrines, temples and buildings are still there in every village. Now Soon Valley is famous for fresh vegetables.

Climate
May–June    Summers    Min 15 to 22 °C; Max 28 to 38 °C
Nov–Feb     winters    Min –3 to –4 °C; Max 6  to 22 °C
July-Aug      Rainy Season

Amb Shareef Hindu temple

The ancient pre-Islamic ancient Hindu temple, is near the Amb Shareef village, on the Sakesar mountain in the Soon Valley. The temple complex, built in brick and mortar, is complex of two temples facing each other. The main temple is several storeys high, roughly 15 to 20 meter tall. To the west about 75 meters lies another smaller temple, which is 2 story or 7 to 8 meters high. It is located on the Sakesar mountain, near Amb Shareef village.

PTV re-broadcasting station
Pakistan Television's re-broadcasting centre has been installed to provide terrestrial transmissions coverage to adjoining areas.

See also

 Salt Range
 Hinduism in Pakistan
 Evacuee Trust Property Board
 Rohtas Fort
 Rawat Fort
 Pharwala
 Sar Jalal
 Tilla Jogian

References

External links
 Sakesar temple picture travelogue

Geography of Punjab, Pakistan
Khushab District
Hill stations in Pakistan
Mountains of Punjab (Pakistan)